Stoker is a 2013 psychological thriller film directed by Park Chan-wook, in his English-language debut, and written by Wentworth Miller. The film stars Mia Wasikowska, Matthew Goode, Nicole Kidman, Dermot Mulroney, and Jacki Weaver.

Stoker had its world premiere at the Sundance Film Festival on 20 January 2013, and was theatrically released in the United States on 1 March 2013, by Fox Searchlight Pictures.

Plot
On her 18th birthday, India Stoker, a girl with a strong acuteness of the senses, is left with her unstable mother Evelyn after her loving father Richard dies in a car crash. At Richard's funeral, Evelyn and India are introduced to Richard's charismatic younger brother Charlie, who has spent his life traveling the world. India, who didn't know Charlie existed, is perturbed by his presence. He announces that he is staying indefinitely to help support India and Evelyn, to Evelyn's delight and India's chagrin.

Shortly after, India witnesses Charlie argue with Mrs. McGarrick, the head caretaker of the house. Mrs. McGarrick complains to Charlie that she has been his "eyes and ears" since he was a boy. Mrs. McGarrick then disappears. Charlie and Evelyn grow intimate while India continues to rebuff his attempts to befriend her. India's great aunt Gwendolyn visits the family, to Evelyn and Charlie's dismay. Gwendolyn shows surprise at Charlie's claims of traveling the world and tells Evelyn that she needs to talk to her about Charlie. Gwendolyn changes hotels due to an unexplained fear and suspicion of Charlie. She loses her cell phone and tries to call the Stokers' home from a phone booth, but Charlie arrives and strangles her to death with his belt. Meanwhile, India discovers Mrs. McGarrick's body in the freezer and realizes Charlie is a murderer.

India unleashes her inner aggression at school and stabs a bully, Chris Pitts, in the hand with a pencil after he tries to land a punch to her head. This draws the attention of another classmate, Whip Taylor. At home, India witnesses Evelyn and Charlie growing intimate. She wanders off to a local diner where she runs into Whip. She and Whip go into the woods, where they proceed to make out, until India aggressively bites his lip. Whip attempts to rape India before Charlie intervenes and breaks Whip's neck with his belt while Whip's body lies on top of India. India aids Charlie in burying the body in her garden. She attempts to call Gwendolyn, but hears her phone ring in the garden, realizing Charlie killed her too. While showering, India masturbates to the memory of the murder, climaxing as she remembers Charlie breaking Whip's neck.

While going through Richard's office to gather things of his she wants to keep, India discovers that a key she received as a birthday present belongs to a locked drawer to Richard's desk. Inside, she finds dozens of letters Charlie wrote to her over the years, which detail his travels and his love for his niece, although they have never met. However, she sees that the sending address is a mental institution. She confronts Charlie, who explains the truth: Charlie killed his and Richard's younger brother Jonathan as a child by burying him alive in a sandbox because he was jealous that Richard paid more attention to him. He was then put in a mental institution. When released on India's 18th birthday, Richard gave Charlie a car, money, and an apartment in New York City on the condition that he stay away from Richard's family. Feeling hurt and betrayed, Charlie bludgeoned Richard to death with a rock and staged the car accident.

India is shocked and angered, but Charlie explains he has come for her and gives her a birthday present, a pair of stiletto heels, to replace her more childish saddle shoes. She seemingly forgives Charlie and grows closer to him after he provides an alibi for her when Sheriff Howard questions her about Whip's disappearance. They grow close to intimate before Evelyn witnesses them. Charlie tells India that, after waiting until she came of age, he wants her to come to New York with him. Later, Evelyn coldly expresses her desire to watch India suffer before confronting Charlie, implying that she knows the truth about Richard's death and Charlie's institutionalization. Charlie seduces Evelyn and then attempts to strangle her with a belt, but India fatally shoots him in the neck with her rifle. She buries Charlie's body in the backyard, then leaves for New York in his car.

India is pulled over for speeding by Sheriff Howard, who asks her why she's in a hurry. She replies that she wanted to catch his attention, then stabs him in the neck with a pair of pruning shears. She pursues the bleeding sheriff into a field to shoot him with her rifle.

Cast

Production
Wentworth Miller, mostly known as an actor, wrote the screenplay for Stoker, as well as a prequel, Uncle Charlie. He used the pseudonym Ted Foulke for submitting his work, later explaining "I just wanted the scripts to sink or swim on their own." On the 2010 Black List, a list of the best unproduced screenplays then making the rounds in Hollywood, Stoker finished in the top 10. Miller described it as a "horror film, a family drama and a psychological thriller". Although influenced by Bram Stoker's Dracula, Miller clarified that Stoker was "not about vampires. It was never meant to be about vampires but it is a horror story. A stoker is one who stokes, which also ties in nicely with the narrative." Alfred Hitchcock's Shadow of a Doubt also influenced the film. Miller said: "The jumping-off point is actually Hitchcock's Shadow of a Doubt. So, that's where we begin, and then we take it in a very, very different direction."

The film marked director Park Chan-wook's English-language debut. In January 2011, it was reported that Mia Wasikowska was in negotiations to play India, and in February, Nicole Kidman also entered negotiations to join the cast. Back in June 2010, before Wasikowska and Kidman were ultimately cast, both Carey Mulligan and Jodie Foster were reported to be in talks to star in the film. In June 2011, it was reported that Matthew Goode was in talks to play Charlie, after Colin Firth, who was attached earlier, had to drop out. Jacki Weaver, Lucas Till, Alden Ehrenreich, Ralph Brown and Dermot Mulroney joined the cast in July and August 2011.

Filming took 40 days beginning in Nashville, Tennessee, in September 2011. The motel scenes were filmed in nearby Murfreesboro on 22 September, and additional scenes were shot in Sewanee, home of the University of the South. Principal photography wrapped on 23 October.

Composer Philip Glass was originally hired to compose the film's score but was replaced by Clint Mansell. Two of Glass' compositions for piano are still included in the finished film however, as revealed in the movie credits. The film is dedicated to the memory of producer Tony Scott, who died after production wrapped.

Hitchcock influence
In addition to screenwriter Wentworth Miller stating that the film was influenced by Shadow of a Doubt, there are a number of Hitchcock's themes, plot devices and motifs used within it. Both Matthew Goode's character and Joseph Cotten's character in Shadow of a Doubt share the name "Uncle Charlie", as well as Hitchcock's use of the likeable criminal. The complexly intertwined relationship that develops between Uncle Charlie and India also references Hitchcock's use of the double with the young Charlie and Uncle Charlie in Shadow of a Doubt. Many of Uncle Charlie and India's key interactions occur on a staircase, which is a Hitchcock motif also used in Shadow of a Doubt. There is a pivotal scene in Stoker that takes place near a train track and the rumbling train makes an aural intrusion, which plays into Hitchcock's use of trains as a sexual euphemism.

Release

Critical reception
 

The film premiered at Sundance and the reviews were mostly positive. In The Guardian, critic Jeremy Kay called the film "a gorgeously mounted family mystery dressed up as a gothic fairytale", and said the film presents viewers with clues worthy of Hitchcock: "Literary references and symbolism abound in Stoker. You can get tied up trying to figure out who is what. That is the idea. All the clues are there. You just have to look closely." The Guardian awarded Stoker four out of five stars in its review.

Richard Roeper of Chicago Sun-Times gave the film 3.5 out of 4, calling it "disturbingly good". Peter Travers from Rolling Stone gave it 3 out of 4, and called it a "thriller of savage beauty". Writing for Variety, Guy Lodge praised the film, calling it "a splendidly demented gumbo of Hitchcock thriller".

Brian Moylan of Hollywood.com praised the performances of Nicole Kidman and Matthew Goode saying "Kidman is at her finest as a disinterested mother. She shows fear and disdain in the most subtle ways, never overplaying a character that could turn into a campy arch villain with just the tiniest bit of scene-chewing. And Goode is the most menacing of all, the malevolent force that hides behind the facade not only of normalcy but of something attractive that you know is incredibly dangerous."

Not all reviews were positive; David Thomson, writing for The New Republic, said that "Stoker trembles between the portentous and the ridiculous, and I think you know which one is going to win." In addition, Josh Slater-Williams of The Skinny labelled the film a "relentless, hollow mess".

Andrew Chan of the Film Critics Circle of Australia writes, "Stoker is constantly engaging, suitably intense, certainly different, always suspenseful and even stylishly directed, but it is not Oldboy".

Kidman's performance as Evie was included on TribecaFilm.com as one of the year's most underrated performances. The author claimed "Kidman exploits Evelyn’s fragility with her every glance and gesture. Kidman as Evelyn radiates a strange kind of unnerving elegance."

Empire ranked it No. 6 on its list of Best Movies of 2013.

Accolades

Home media
The film was released on DVD and Blu-ray Disc on 18 June 2013.

References

External links
 
 
 
 

2013 films
2013 thriller films
2010s coming-of-age films
2013 independent films
2010s psychological thriller films
2010s thriller films
2010s serial killer films
2013 psychological thriller films
American coming-of-age films
American thriller films
American independent films
American serial killer films
American psychological thriller films
British coming-of-age films
British thriller films
British independent films
British serial killer films
British psychological thriller films
Films about brothers
Films about dysfunctional families
Films about widowhood
Films directed by Park Chan-wook
Films scored by Clint Mansell
Films set in 2012
Films set in psychiatric hospitals
Films set in Connecticut
Films shot in Tennessee
Fox Searchlight Pictures films
Fratricide in fiction
Incest in film
Indian Paintbrush (production company) films
American horror drama films
British horror drama films
Southern Gothic films
Scott Free Productions films
2010s English-language films
2010s American films
2010s British films